Waynesville is an unincorporated community in Wayne Township, Bartholomew County, in the U.S. state of Indiana.

History
A post office was established at Waynesville in 1853 and remained in operation until it was discontinued in 1907.

Geography

Demographics

Waynesville has appeared once as a separate return in the U.S. Census. In 1870, the community has a population of 104.

References

External links

Unincorporated communities in Bartholomew County, Indiana
Unincorporated communities in Indiana
1853 establishments in Indiana
Populated places established in 1853